"What Can I Do for You?" is a song by R&B girl group Labelle.  It was released as the follow-up single to the number-one charting song, "Lady Marmalade", in 1975. It peaked at number 48 on the Billboard Hot 100, number 8 on the Billboard Hot Soul Singles chart, and number 10 on the Cashbox Top 100 R&B chart.

Chart performance

References 

1975 singles
Labelle songs
1974 songs
Epic Records singles